Watersmeet Township is a civil township of Gogebic County in the Upper Peninsula of the U.S. state of Michigan. The population was 1,417 at the 2010 census, slightly down from 1,472 at the 2000 census.  Chippewa students made up half of the student body and winning high school basketball team in the early 2000s. It was featured in the 2007 documentary Nimrod Nation, shown on The Sundance Channel.

The Lac Vieux Desert Indian Reservation is located in two small segments within Watersmeet Township.

History
The Lac Vieux Desert Indian Reservation was established by treaty under the United States in 1854. This band of the Lake Superior Band of Chippewa Indians, a large and decentralized group of Anishinaabe bands, had occupied this territory since the 17th century.

The European-American community of Watersmeet was platted in 1884, designated as a station of the Chicago, St. Paul, Minneapolis & Omaha Railways.

In late 2003 and early 2004, the boys' high school basketball team of the K-12 Watersmeet Township School was featured in a series of commercials on ESPN. ESPN chose Watersmeet for the commercials in part because of  the school's sport teams' unusual nickname of Nimrods. The tag line of the commercials was "Without sports, who would cheer for the Nimrods?" The ads were so popular that the team, its coach, and octogenarian fan Dale Jenkins, all of whom were featured on the commercials, appeared on The Tonight Show on March 15, 2004.

The township and the Nimrods are the focus of an 8-part documentary, Nimrod Nation, which aired on The Sundance Channel. Filming started in September 2005 and continued until June 2006. Actor Robert Redford, one of the channel's owners and a champion of Native American issues, was reported to have been inspired to make the documentary when he learned that Watersmeet Township School's student body (and varsity basketball team) was approximately 50 percent Native American.  The documentary won a Peabody Award in 2007.

Since that time, the township has consolidated schools. (At the time, 9-12 grade enrollment was 78; the school system  absorbed 13 of neighboring Marenisco's 60 K-12 students. The Watersmeet township high school enrollment in 2005-2006 enrollment was a total of 96.

The township is the location of the federally recognized Lac Vieux Desert Band of Lake Superior Chippewa; their land base is the Lac Vieux Desert Indian Reservation. Attractions in Watersmeet include the Lac Vieux Desert resort and casino, owned and operated by the tribe. It includes a golf course. The Lights of Paulding occur nearby and are supported by local legend.

Geography

Climate
The climate is described as Humid Continental by the Köppen Climate System, abbreviated as Dfb.

Demographics
As of the census of 2000, there were 1,472 people, 552 households, and 385 families residing in the township. The population density was 5.8 per square mile (2.2/km).  There were 1,466 housing units at an average density of 5.8 per square mile (2.2/km).  The racial makeup of the township was 79.76% White, 0.14% African American, 17.93% Native American, 0.07% Asian, 0.48% from other races, and 1.63% from two or more races. Hispanic or Latino of any race were 1.02% of the population.

There were 552 households, out of which 24.1% had children under the age of 18 living with them, 55.4% were married couples living together, 9.1% had a female householder with no husband present, and 30.1% were non-families. 26.3% of all households were made up of individuals, and 11.4% had someone living alone who was 65 years of age or older.  The average household size was 2.30 and the average family size was 2.73.

In the township the population was spread out, with 21.8% under the age of 18, 12.4% from 18 to 24, 19.4% from 25 to 44, 28.5% from 45 to 64, and 17.9% who were 65 years of age or older.  The median age was 42 years. For every 100 females, there were 121.4 males.  For every 100 females age 18 and over, there were 120.5 males.

The median income for a household in the township was $32,019, and the median income for a family was $36,359. Males had a median income of $31,458 versus $20,588 for females. The per capita income for the township was $17,874.  About 6.5% of families and 19.8% of the population were below the poverty line, including 21.6% of those under age 18 and 6.2% of those age 65 or over.

Transportation
Indian Trails provides daily intercity bus service between St. Ignace and Ironwood, Michigan.

References

Townships in Gogebic County, Michigan
Townships in Michigan